Chicken George was a fast food restaurant chain based in Baltimore, Maryland. The first restaurant was established by Theodore Holmes in November 1979 in the Mondawmin Mall in Baltimore. The company later expanded to a total of six restaurants in Baltimore, and also branched out to Philadelphia, Pennsylvania, and Washington D.C. Franchise restaurants were also existent in Atlanta, Los Angeles and in other cities. In September 1991, the company filed for bankruptcy to be dissolved.

Company overview

Beginnings
The restaurants were owned by Joloj Industries, Inc., which was founded by Theodore Holmes. The company's name was chosen based upon a character name in the book Roots: The Saga of an American Family. At its prime, the company had six restaurants in Baltimore, two in Philadelphia, Pennsylvania and a location in Washington D.C., along with franchise restaurants. The chain was very popular in Baltimore, having been described as "that it seemingly became a household name overnight" by the Baltimore Afro-American newspaper. In August, 1980 the company was described by the Baltimore Afro-American as "the highest grossing single chicken outlet in the country" (per the advisement of Theodore Holmes to the newspaper). In 1982 the company earned sales revenue of US$14 million.

Franchises
The company had franchises in Atlanta, Los Angeles and in other states, and it was reported in January 1983 that the company had plans to expand in Oklahoma, with a franchise agreement having been signed.

Ownership
In January 1987, the company and the rights to the company's concept was purchased by George, Hill & Sons Management. In January 1989, the company was purchased by Meldon S. Hollis Jr., and in September 1991 the company filed to dissolve the business in Chapter 7 bankruptcy proceedings.

Products
Theodore Holmes spent $750,000 developing the company's chicken products, utilizing personal taste testing by himself and staff members. Fare included chicken, chicken salad, gumbo, fish and chips and various side dishes such as greens, biscuits, french fries and rice. The company opted to not serve pork products, and used beef to flavor its various products.

Theodore Holmes
Theodore Holmes was the founder and chief executive officer of Chicken George restaurants. In September, 1991 it was reported by The Baltimore Sun that Chicken George became the "largest black-owned fast-food company in the country" after its creation. Holmes died on November 29, 2011, at the age of 72, from complications due to diabetes.

Restaurants of the same name overseas
There is an unrelated company in England that operates restaurants named Chicken George in Round Green, Luton, England and in Sudbury, Suffolk, England. As well as another in Sydney, Australia operating takeaway fried chicken/butchers in the suburbs; Randwick, Burwood, Marrickville and Sylvania.

See also

 Ameche's Drive-in – a former fast-food restaurant chain based in Baltimore, Maryland
 Gino's Hamburgers – a former fast-food restaurant chain founded in Baltimore, Maryland
 List of defunct fast-food restaurant chains
 List of fast-food chicken restaurants

References

Further reading
 Newswatch. Newswatch Communications Limited. Volume 1. 1985. p. 36.

Defunct restaurant chains in the United States
Defunct fast-food chains in the United States
Regional restaurant chains in the United States
Companies that filed for Chapter 11 bankruptcy in 1991
Defunct restaurants in Maryland
Defunct restaurants in Philadelphia
Fast-food poultry restaurants
Restaurants in Baltimore
1979 establishments in Maryland
Restaurants established in 1979
1991 disestablishments in the United States